Floyd Ganassi Jr. (born May 24, 1958) better known as Chip Ganassi, is a US businessman, former racing driver, current team owner and member of the Motorsports Hall of Fame of America. He has been involved with the North American auto racing scene for over 30 years. He is owner and CEO of Chip Ganassi Racing which operates teams in the IndyCar Series, WeatherTech SportsCar Championship, FIA World Endurance Championship, and Extreme E. He is the only team owner in history to have won the Indianapolis 500, the Daytona 500, the Brickyard 400, the Rolex 24 at Daytona, the 12 Hours of Sebring and most recently the 24 Hours of Le Mans.

Racing driver
Ganassi attended the Bob Bondurant Driving School in 1977 while a student at the Fox Chapel Area High School. He won his first auto race in a Formula Ford at the age of 18. He began his CART (Champ Car) racing career [Ed. at Trenton Speedway in 1978-`79—see Talk Page] in 1982 upon graduating from Duquesne. Though a broken camshaft kept him from completing his first CART race at Phoenix, Ganassi qualified with the fastest speed, 197 mph, and competed in the Indianapolis 500 five times, with a best finish of 8th in 1983. He was voted the Most Improved Driver in 1983, and took 9th position in the CART standings. During that season, he took Patrick Racing’s Wildcat onto the podium twice, the first at Caesars Palace in Las Vegas, then again at Laguna Seca. The following season, he would go on and finish a career best second in to 1984 Budweiser Grand Prix of Cleveland, however, in his next race his career was cut short by a huge crash at Michigan involving Al Unser Jr. In a race full of huge accidents, he spun his car coming off one of the banked turns, he then collected Unser Jr., his car then skated across the grass run-off area, slammed into the inside Armco barrier, his car tumbled multiple times and broke apart- although Unser Jr. was uninjured, Ganassi suffered serious head injuries. When CART doctor Stephen Olvey reached Ganassi he found him unconscious and unresponsive, and initially feared the driver might not have survived. When Olvey was about to start administering CPR, Ganassi resumed breathing. He was airlifted to the University of Michigan Hospital. After a time he regained consciousness, and while initially suffered short term memory loss he would go on to feel he had made a full recovery. Following the accident he did not race for 9 months; he never raced full-time again.

Although he returned to race briefly in CART and IMSA in 1986. Ganassi achieved his top sportscar result in the 1986 Kodak Copies 500 at Watkins Glen that taking the Camel Light class victory, with his race partner, Bob Earl (7th overall). He also recorded a seventh-place finish a month early in the Löwenbräu Classic, at Road America, assisted by David Sears. Both times driving for Spice Engineering, in one for their Spice-Pontiac SE86CL. In what was to be his last international race outing, Ganassi was entered into the 1987 24 Hours of Le Mans, as a member of the Kouros Racing. One of his teammates for the event, Johnny Dumfries set the fastest lap of the race prior to handing the car over to Ganassi upon whom the gearbox broke.

Team owner

Personal life
Ganassi was formerly a vice president of FRG Group, his father's organization involved in commercial real estate, transportation and other areas. In addition to his racing interests, he is also a former minority owner of the Pittsburgh Pirates major league baseball team. Ganassi is a strong supporter of St. Jude Children's Research Hospital, to which his teams have donated over US$500,000.

He graduated from the Fox Chapel Area High School in 1978 and with a degree in finance from Duquesne University in 1982. He received an Honorary Doctorate from Carnegie Mellon University in 2011.

Awards
He was inducted into the Motorsports Hall of Fame of America in 2016.

Racing record

Career highlights

American open-wheel racing results
(key)

CART

Indianapolis 500

Complete 24 Hours of Le Mans results

Complete 24 Hours of Daytona results

Complete 24 Hours of Spa results

References

External links

 
 
 Chip Ganassi Racing
 Owner Ganassi gets past financial difficulties

1958 births
Duquesne University alumni
Indianapolis 500 drivers
IndyCar Series team owners
Living people
NASCAR team owners
Racing drivers from Pennsylvania
Racing drivers from Pittsburgh
Sportspeople from Pittsburgh
World Sportscar Championship drivers
24 Hours of Le Mans drivers
24 Hours of Daytona drivers
24 Hours of Spa drivers
SCCA Formula Super Vee drivers
People from Fox Chapel, Pennsylvania
American people of Italian descent
A. J. Foyt Enterprises drivers
Sports car racing team owners
Sauber Motorsport drivers